The 3rd Biathlon European Championships were held in Ridnaun, Italy. Six competitions were held for athletes U26: sprint, individual and relays.

Results

U26

Men's

Women's

Medal table

References

External links 
 IBU full results

Biathlon European Championships
International sports competitions hosted by Italy
1996 in biathlon
1996 in Italian sport
Biathlon competitions in Italy